Nika Fleiss (born 14 December 1984) is a Croatian former alpine skier.

Fleiss was born in Brežice, at the time SR Slovenia, SFR Yugoslavia. She lives in Samobor. Having started skiing at the age of 3, her best results were in slalom. 

After several successful races in junior category, her first World Cup race was 27 October 2002 in Sölden. Fleiss represented Croatia in 2002, 2006 and 2010 Winter Olympics.

Her best World Cup result is 6th place in Lenzerheide (slalom) in 2005. She missed 2006/07 season because of injury. After the 2009/10 season she retired from the sport.

References

External links
 FIS profile of Nika Fleiss

1984 births
Living people
Croatian female alpine skiers
Alpine skiers at the 2002 Winter Olympics
Alpine skiers at the 2006 Winter Olympics
Alpine skiers at the 2010 Winter Olympics
Olympic alpine skiers of Croatia
Croatian people of German descent
Croatian sportsperson-politicians